Francisco Luis Craig (February 2, 1965) is a former American football wide receiver who played one season with the Detroit Lions of the National Football League (NFL). He was drafted by the Lions in the tenth round of the 1988 NFL Draft. He played college football at University of California, Los Angeles and attended Ramona High School in Riverside, California. Craig was also a member of the Toronto Argonauts and Sacramento Surge.

References

External links
Just Sports Stats

Living people
1965 births
Players of American football from California
American football wide receivers
Canadian football wide receivers
American players of Canadian football
UCLA Bruins football players
Detroit Lions players
Toronto Argonauts players
Sacramento Surge players
Sportspeople from Santa Maria, California